MLB Sunday Leadoff  is an American presentation of Major League Baseball (MLB) games produced by NBC Sports for the NBCUniversal-owned streaming service Peacock. One game each season is simulcast on NBC. It is NBC Sports' first national MLB package since 2000.

Peacock's coverage will include 19 Sunday regular season games during the 2023 MLB season, starting at either 11:30 a.m., 12:00 p.m., or 1:00 p.m. ET.

History
In March 2022, it was reported by The Wall Street Journal that NBC Sports was finalizing an agreement to establish a new package of Sunday afternoon games beginning in the 2022 MLB season. The package would be a successor to TBS's previous Sunday afternoon package during the later half of the season; as part of a contract renewal, TBS replaced these games with a new Tuesday night package across the entire regular season.

As a prelude to the deal, Peacock had exclusively aired a June 2021 series between the Philadelphia Phillies and San Francisco Giants. It was co-produced by NBC Sports Bay Area and NBC Sports Philadelphia, and featured a broadcast team led by the Giants' lead play-by-play announcer Jon Miller and his partner Mike Krukow, joined by the Phillies' analysts John Kruk and Jimmy Rollins.

NBC formally announced the deal on April 6, with a reported value of $30 million per-season. As part of the agreement, Peacock will also carry the All-Star Futures Game, as well as an MLB content hub featuring classic games and other video content.

On April 13, 2022, NBC Sports announced that the games would be branded as MLB Sunday Leadoff.

The inaugural broadcast was a game featuring the Chicago White Sox at the Boston Red Sox on May 8. The game was also simulcast on the NBC broadcast network, marking its first MLB broadcast since Game 6 of the 2000 American League Championship Series on October 17, 2000, and its first regular season MLB broadcast since September 29, 1995. All other games will be exclusive to Peacock Premium subscribers. 

In Canada, where Peacock is not available, games featuring the Toronto Blue Jays are telecast by Sportsnet using its regular broadcast team. For all other games in Canada and in all other international markets, MLB Sunday Leadoff games are available live and on demand on the MLB.TV subscription service.

For the 2023 season, the amount of games increased to 19. Six games will start at 11:30 a.m., ten will start at 12:00 p.m., and 3 will start at 1:00 p.m. ET. For the second consecutive year, one game will be simulcasted on NBC.

Production 
The broadcasts were described as aiming for a "hyper-local telecast with a national flair". The games' on-air presentation builds upon that of NBC Sports' regional MLB coverage. Former Los Angeles Dodgers broadcaster Vin Scully (who served as NBC's lead play-by-play commentator for its MLB coverage from 1983 to 1989) narrated a special introduction for the first broadcast, emphasizing NBC's history as an MLB broadcaster (including its historic Game of the Week broadcasts).

Personnel 

Jason Benetti (who calls Chicago White Sox games for NBC Sports Chicago, and also worked NBC's telecasts of baseball during the 2020 Summer Olympics) served as the lead by-play announcer for the first season, joined by rotating analysts from each participating team. Ahmed Fareed would serve as the studio host.

Benetti joined Fox Sports in August 2022; NBC has not yet named a replacement play-by-play announcer for future seasons.

Schedule 
The 2022 schedule has 23 of the 30 teams within MLB appearing at least once. Not appearing are the Arizona Diamondbacks, Colorado Rockies, Milwaukee Brewers, Minnesota Twins, Seattle Mariners, Tampa Bay Rays, and Texas Rangers.

The games have an exclusive midday window, with the first games carrying an 11:30 a.m. ET scheduling, and later games having an 12:00 p.m. ET scheduling; on days scheduled for games on Peacock, no other MLB games will begin until at least 1:30 p.m. ET.

In an August 2022 press release, the NBC Sports Group indicated a "full season" of MLB Sunday Leadoff in 2023, presumably meaning the schedule will feature more than the 18 weeks in 2022 and begin in April.

 
Source:

Notes
 Jon Miller filled in for primary play-by-play voice Jason Benetti, who instead called the Crosstown Classic between the Chicago Cubs and Chicago White Sox on NBC Sports Chicago.
 While there wasn’t a regular commentary team, Ahmed Fareed, Craig Monroe, and Britney Eurton did select commentary, mostly interviews, during the broadcast.

See also
Friday Night Baseball
MLB Game of the Week Live on YouTube

References

External links
 

Sunday Leadoff
American sports television series
Sports telecast series
Major League Baseball on NBC
Peacock (streaming service) original programming
2022 American television series debuts
2020s American television series